Abbey Park may refer to:

Abbey Park (Grimsby), England, a former football ground
Abbey Park, Leicester, England, a public park
Abbey Park, Nottinghamshire, England, a suburb
Abbey Park High School, Oakville, Ontario, Canada
Abbey Park, the home ground of Armagh Harps GFC in Armagh, County Armagh, Northern Ireland
Abbey Park, Kilwinning, the home ground of Kilwinning Rangers F.C.

See also
Park Abbey